{{Taxobox
| name = Gloeocystidiellum porosum
| regnum = Fungi
| phylum = Basidiomycota
| classis = Agaricomycetes
| subclassis = Incertae sedis
| ordo = Russulales
| familia = Stereaceae
| genus = Gloeocystidiellum
| species = G. porosum
| binomial = Gloeocystidiellum porosum
| binomial_authority = (Berk. & M.A. Curtis) Donk, (1931)
| synonyms = 
Corticium letendrei 
Corticium porosumvCorticium stramineum Gloeocystidium letendrei Gloeocystidium porosum Terana porosa Xerocarpus letendrei [as 'letendri']}}Gloeocystidiellum porosum'' is a plant pathogen.

References

External links 
 Index Fungorum
 USDA ARS Fungal Database

Fungal plant pathogens and diseases
Russulales
Fungi described in 1931